Hall Green railway station serves the Hall Green area of Birmingham in the West Midlands of England.  The station, and all trains serving it, are operated by West Midlands Trains.

History

The station was opened by the Great Western Railway on 9 December 1908, on the North Warwickshire Line which had opened a few months earlier. The station was originally provided with extensive goods facilities, but these were closed in 1969, and the area now forms part of the station car park.

Services
During Monday to Saturday daytimes:

 3 trains per hour northbound to Birmingham Moor Street and Birmingham Snow Hill continuing to Stourbridge Junction, with some trains continuing onward to Kidderminster and Worcester.  

On Sundays, there is an hourly train each way between Worcester, Birmingham, Shirley and Stratford-upon-Avon that calls.

References

External links

Rail Around Birmingham and the West Midlands: Hall Green station
Warwickshire Railways: Hall Green station

Railway stations in Birmingham, West Midlands
DfT Category E stations
Former Great Western Railway stations
Railway stations in Great Britain opened in 1908
Railway stations served by West Midlands Trains
1908 establishments in England